Crooked Teeth is the ninth studio album by American rock band Papa Roach. It was released on May 19, 2017 through Eleven Seven Music. Crooked Teeth debuted at number 20 in the US and UK.

Release
The title track of the album was released as a promotional single on November 1, 2016. The album's first single, "Help" was released on February 17, 2017, and topped the Billboard Mainstream Rock Songs chart in April 2017. A second single, "American Dreams", was released in April, and peaked at number three at the same chart. On November 12, 2017, a third single, "Born for Greatness" was released and topped the Billboard Mainstream Rock Songs chart in January 2018. The album debuted at number 20 on the Billboard 200 and number one on the Billboard Top Hard Rock Albums chart, selling 23,000 equivalent units, 18,000 in pure album sales.

Reception
The album has received generally positive reviews from critics. Loudwire praised the album's mix of old and new sounds from the band, concluding that "It's obvious Papa Roach aren’t straying too far outside of the lines of what made them so appealing in both the beginning of their career and in recent years, but at almost a quarter century into the game when so many of their peers have been forgotten, they continue to stay relevant. What’s most compelling about the band, other than their more than admirable longevity, is continually trying to find the balance between the then and the now. On Crooked Teeth, it’s by far the closest they've come to giving fans of both eras an equal helping of each, which is no easy feat."

Track listing

Personnel

Papa Roach
 Jacoby Shaddix – lead vocals 
 Jerry Horton – guitar, backing vocals
 Tobin Esperance – bass, backing vocals
 Tony Palermo – drums

Additional musicians
 Anthony Esperance – additional guitars
 Skylar Grey – additional vocals on "Periscope"
 Machine Gun Kelly – additional vocals on "Sunrise Trailer Park"

Technical personnel
 Nicholas "RAS" Furlong – production, arrangements, executive producer
 Colin "Colin Brittain" Cunningham – production, arrangements, engineering, mixing on "My Medication", "Periscope", and "None of the Above"
 Jason Evigan – production and arrangements on "Born for Greatness"
 Josh Wilbur – mixing on "Break the Fall", "Crooked Teeth", "Born for Greatness", "American Dreams", and "Help"
 Lewis Kovac – executive producer, management for 10th Street Entertainment
 Darren Craig – design and layout
 Butch Rufus – cover model
 Ian Dietrich – management for 10th Street Entertainment

Charts

Weekly charts

Year-end charts

Certifications

References

Papa Roach albums
2017 albums
Eleven Seven Label Group albums
Albums produced by Colin Brittain